Jearl is a given name. Notable people with the name include:

Jearl Margaritha (born 2000), Dutch footballer
Jearl Miles Clark (born 1966), American athlete
Jearl Walker (born 1945), American physicist